The Denver Museum of Nature & Science is a municipal natural history and science museum in Denver, Colorado. It is a resource for informal science education in the Rocky Mountain region. A variety of exhibitions, programs, and activities help museum visitors learn about the natural history of Colorado, Earth, and the universe. The  building houses more than one million objects in its collections including natural history and anthropological materials, as well as archival and library resources.

The museum is an independent, nonprofit institution with approximately 350 full-time and part-time staff, more than 1,800 volunteers, and a 25-member board of trustees. It is accredited by the American Alliance of Museums and is a Smithsonian Institution affiliate.

Education programs
 
The museum provides programming in six main areas. The exhibitions, IMAX films, lectures, classes, and programs pertain to one or more of the following core competencies: anthropology, geology, health science, paleontology, space science, and zoology. More than 300,000 students and teachers visit the museum with school groups each year. In addition, the museum has science outreach programs and distance–learning opportunities for families, schools and surrounding communities. The museum also offers ongoing professional training workshops for teachers.

History

In 1868, Edwin Carter moved into a tiny cabin in Breckenridge, Colorado, to pursue his passion, the scientific study of the birds and mammals of the Rocky Mountains. Almost single-handedly, Carter assembled one of the most complete collections of Colorado fauna then in existence.

Word of Carter's collection spread and, in 1892, a group of prominent Denver citizens declared their interest in moving his collection to the capital city for all to see. Carter offered to sell the entire collection for $10,000. The founders also secured a collection of butterflies and moths, and a collection of crystallized gold.

Together, these three collections formed the nucleus of what would become the Colorado Museum of Natural History, officially incorporated on December 6, 1900. After years of preparation and construction, the Colorado Museum of Natural History finally opened to the public on July 1, 1908. John F. Campion, the first president of the board, said in his dedication address, "A museum of natural history is never finished". The first director was hired and quickly recruited staff to build more exhibits and create public programs. By 1918, another wing had opened and research efforts were well underway.

In 1927, a team led by the Colorado Museum discovered two stone projectile points embedded in an extinct species of bison, in Folsom, New Mexico. These Folsom points demonstrated that humans had lived in North America more than 10,000 years ago, hundreds of years earlier than previously believed.

The city of Denver increased its funding for the museum, leading to a name change to Denver Museum of Natural History in 1948.  The name was changed again in 2000 to the present Denver Museum of Nature and Science, reflecting the institution's wider focus.

The museum is partially funded by the Scientific and Cultural Facilities District (SCFD), which was created by area voters in 1988. It has also attracted large donations from benefactors, such as Morgridge Family Foundation led by philanthropist Carrie Morgridge, which gave $8 million to the museum in 2010, described as being the largest single gift since its founding.

Permanent exhibits  

Expedition Health

Expedition Health teaches visitors about the human body, including the science of taste. It opened on March 30, 2009, replacing the former Hall of Life.

Space Odyssey

Space Odyssey, which opened in 2003 and underwent a refurbishment in 2020, is about the Universe and our place in it. One major highlight of the exhibit is a full-scale replica of a Mars Exploration Rover, which was formerly found outside the exhibit from around 2004 to around 2016 or 2017.

Prehistoric Journey

Prehistoric Journey, which opened in 1995, traces the evolution of life on Earth. Displays include dinosaur skeletons and skulls of Dimetrodon, Eryops, Allosaurus, Stegosaurus, Diplodocus, Edmontosaurus, Maiasaura, Megacerops, Archaeotherium, Hyaenodon, Merycoidodon, Stenomylus, Merycochoerus, Moropus, Dinohyus, Hesperotestudo, Gomphotherium, Synthetoceras and Teleoceras, a sea lily reef diorama from 435 million years ago, a cast/replica skull of the ancient placoderm fish, Dunkleosteus, and a collection of trilobites.

Wildlife Halls

The Wildlife Halls are animal dioramas showing scenes of daily life of many different animals, one of the largest collections of its type in North America. The Wildlife Halls in the museum are:

Level 3 Wildlife Halls:

Birds of the Americas

Explore Colorado (also known as Explore Colorado: From Plains to Peaks)

Northern and Rare Birds (also known as Birds of North America)

South America (also known as Sketches of South America)

Botswana, Africa (also known as Africa-Botswana: Sharing a Fragile Land and Botswana: Safari to Wild Africa)

Level 2 Wildlife Halls:

Bears and Sea Mammals (also known as Into the Wild: Bears and Sea Mammals and North America's Bears and Northern Sea Mammals)

Edge of the Wild

North American Wildlife (also known as North America's Wild Places and Scenes of Change)

Australia and South Pacific Islands (also known as Australia and South Pacific)

Out of all of the dioramas in the museum listed here, only one, Western Brazil, which depicted wildlife on the Brazilian savanna, was removed for not being scientifically accurate, because it included animals that didn't naturally interact with each other in the wild. However, at least three pieces of evidence that prove that the diorama did exist can be found in the museum: one being a cropped image of the screenshot of the diorama's brocket deer from the museum's 1961 annual report in Edge of the Wild, and the other two being the scarlet macaw and blue-fronted parrot found in the glass case at South America's entry wall.

Insects & Butterflies

Insects & Butterflies is a wildlife exhibit on the first floor that's separated into four displays: Pinning Down Insects, which classifies the different groups of arthropods and features the twelve common orders of insects; Deceits & Defenses, which shows different insects that have their own ways of defending themselves, as well as including a miniature diorama depicting a foothills shrubland with many hidden insects; Colorado Lepidoptera, which features 171 species of butterflies and moths found in Colorado including the Colorado hairstreak, Colorado's state insect; and Form Follows Function, which shows the life cycle of a mourning cloak butterfly, a small collection of rainforest butterflies, and two species of Morpho butterflies next to a model of scales from one of the wings of a blue morpho.

Egyptian Mummies

Egyptian Mummies contains two mummies, along with several coffins and other various antiquities from ancient Egypt. In both 1991 and 2016, the mummies were subjected to CT scans at Children's Hospital in Aurora, Colorado. Also on display is a miniature temple, based on one from the time of King Ramses II.

Coors Gems & Minerals

Coors Gems & Minerals is a hall where visitors can examine many colorful crystals and minerals found both locally and globally. It features a re-created mine based on the Sweet Home mine, where the Alma King, the largest specimen of rhodochrosite exhibited near the entrance, was originally found on August 21, 1992. It is also home to the museum's oldest exhibit: crystallized leaf gold, which was donated in 1900, the same year the museum was founded.

Crane Hall of North American Indian Cultures

The Crane Hall of North American Indian Cultures explores the diversity among Native American groups and the practicality and artistry of their everyday objects. One of its highlights is the totem poles found near the entrance.

In addition to the exhibit halls, skeletons of Tyrannosaurus rex, a pair of Thalassomedon and a fin whale, as well as a replica of the Chief Kyan totem pole, can be found in the rotunda. A display that shows how escalators work is also found at one of the two up escalators on the first floor.

Research and collections

 The Anthropology Collection contains over 50,000 objects and is made up of archaeological and ethnological artifacts from North America. The department also curates collections from Central and South America, Africa, Asia, and Oceania. Additional holdings include the 800-piece Ethnological Art Collection, and archival photographs and documents. The department is fully committed to compliance with the 1990 Native American Graves Protection and Repatriation Act (NAGPRA) and all other national and international laws that impact anthropological objects.
 Earth Sciences Collection consists of six main groups: vertebrate paleontology, paleobotany, invertebrate paleontology, minerals, meteorites, and micromount.
 Health Sciences Collection is composed of rare and unique human anatomy specimens, as well as a small selection of pieces of medical importance.
 Space Sciences Lab is responsible for the museum's Scientific Instruments Collection. This collection is composed of instruments that have been used by museum staff members or are excellent type-examples of particular instruments. In addition, the Department of Space Sciences maintains a large digital collection of images and multimedia assets (presentations, video, visualizations) of use in research, public programs, and Space Odyssey.
 Zoology Collection houses over 900,000 specimens or specimen lots (groups of specimens) including over 40,000 vials of arachnids (spiders and their relatives), over 780,000 insects, especially the orders Coleoptera (the beetles) and Lepidoptera (the butterflies and moths), 17,000 shell lots representing shells from all over the world, approximately 52,000 bird specimens, including a significant nest and egg collection, over 14,000 specimens of mammals, including several threatened or endangered species and several species now considered extinct. The small botany collection includes over 2,500 specimens representing 130 families. Specimens records are published, via Arctos and Symbiota, to data portals such as SCAN, ORNIS, MANIS, VertNet, GBIF, GenBank, and BISON.
 Bailey Library and Archives focuses on anthropology, earth sciences, health sciences, space sciences, zoology, the Rocky Mountain West, and museum studies. It contains over 53,000 publications, 2,500 rare books, and 9,000 volumes of scientific periodicals.

Selection of temporary exhibits
 Ancient Denver, a series of paintings by local artists that depict the Denver area from 300 million years ago to the present.
 Maya: Hidden Worlds Revealed, a large exhibit covering art, culture, astronomy, religion, ball games and warfare, as well as potential reasons for the collapse of the Mayan empire.
 Whales: Giants of the Deep, an exhibit that originated in New Zealand, where there was a large whale-fishing industry. The exhibit includes whale skulls and skeletons, videos, cultural artifacts, and "explaration stations".
 Traveling the Silk Road, artifacts from the ancient trade route, from Xi’an, the imperial city of China's Tang Dynasty, to Istanbul.

Gates Planetarium
Gates Planetarium is a 125-seat planetarium that features unidirectional, semi-reclining stadium seating, 16.4 surround-sound system featuring Ambisonic, a 3-D spatial sound system, and a perforated metal dome,  in diameter and tilted 25 degrees. The current planetarium replaces an older, dome-style planetarium.

Phipps IMAX Theater

The Phipps IMAX Theater on the second floor of the museum was built as the Phipps Auditorium in 1940, and was used for lectures, concerts, and films until 1980. Renovated and reopened in 1983 as the Phipps IMAX Theater, it seats 440 people and now shows large-format IMAX films daily.

In July 2022, the Phipps IMAX Theater was closed for renovations for sound, visual, and lobby. The theater is now open as of February 2023 and gave it the new name of "Infinity Theater". It is now a state of the art theater suitable for all types of visual enjoyment.

Morgridge Family Exploration Center and Avenir Collections Facility
In 2014, a $70 million addition was added to the museum containing the Morgridge Family Exploration Center and the Avenir Collections Center.

The Morgridge Family Exploration Center constitutes three above-ground levels that encourage visitors to learn about science and the natural world. The center includes Exploration Studios, a new temporary exhibition gallery, an atrium space, a completely-redeveloped Discovery Zone for early learners, and the outdoor, Boettcher Plaza with unique public art.

The Avenir Collections Center, part of a $70 million expansion in 2007, is a climate-controlled facility devoted to housing for nearly 1.5 million artifacts and specimens. The facility includes 63,000 square feet in two underground levels, and holds specimens such as bison from the 1870s, passenger pigeons, the last grizzly bear to be killed in Colorado in 1979, and roadkill brought in by the public. The data from these specimens is placed in online databases, and linked to public databases, like BioPortal.

Museum secrets
The museum contains a number of hidden secrets that visitors may search for. On the Denver Museum website, there are four different downloadable scavenger hunts available, ranging from State Parks to "Museum Treasures". Kent Pendleton, one of the museum's diorama painters, painted eight elves in his work, hidden throughout the museum. Guests are encouraged to search for the elves with one of the printable scavenger hunts. In the IMAX lobby entrance there are several painted pictures hidden on the walls relating to Star Wars.

Gallery

See also
 List of landmarks of Denver
 List of museums in Colorado
 Making North America (film) – features V.P. Kirk Johnson

References

External links

 Denver Museum of Nature & Science on Google Cultural Institute

Museums in Denver
Institutions accredited by the American Alliance of Museums
IMAX venues
Dinosaur museums in the United States
Natural history museums in Colorado
Science museums in Colorado
Egyptological collections in the United States
Articles containing video clips
Paleontology in Colorado
Mesoamerican art museums in the United States
Native American museums in Colorado